Amanda Clayton (born October 24, 1981) is an American actress, best known for her role as Alex Montgomery in the Oprah Winfrey Network prime time soap opera, If Loving You Is Wrong.

Life and career
Clayton was born in Johnston, Rhode Island. She studied at the University of Rhode Island and later moved to New York City to attend New York Conservatory for Dramatic Arts in 2005. She made her film debut in 2006, playing a supporting role in the independent film December Ends. In 2012, Clayton landed the supporting role of Sarah Carter in the Disney adventure film John Carter. She later went to appear in guest starring roles on The Mentalist and Rizzoli & Isles.

In 2014, she was cast as a lead, alongside Edwina Findley, Heather Hemmens, Zulay Henao, and April Parker Jones in the Oprah Winfrey Network prime time soap opera If Loving You Is Wrong. The series ended in 2020 after five seasons. Later in 2014, she was cast opposite Miles Teller and Katey Sagal in the biographical drama film Bleed For This about boxer, Vinny Pazienza. 

In addition to Bleed For This, Clayton is the female lead in two additional feature-length films set for release in 2016, the comedy, The Bet and the drama, Bad Frank. In 2017, she played the leading role in the Lifetime Movie Cradle Swapping, and the following year in Mommy's Little Angel.

In 2018, Clayton was cast in the Showtime drama series, City on a Hill.

Filmography

Film

Television

References

External links

American film actresses
American television actresses
American soap opera actresses
People from Johnston, Rhode Island
Living people
University of Rhode Island alumni
21st-century American actresses
1981 births